Amand-Joseph Fava (1826–1899) was a French bishop.

Fava was ordained in 1851, and was Bishop of Martinique (Fort-de-France e Saint Pierre) in the Antilles from 1871 until 1875 when he became Bishop of Grenoble in France.

References 

1826 births
1899 deaths
19th-century French Roman Catholic bishops
19th-century Roman Catholic bishops in the Caribbean
Roman Catholic bishops of Fort-de-France–Saint-Pierre